Dendryphantes secretus is a jumping spider species in the genus Dendryphantes that lives in Kazakhstan. The male was first described by Wanda Wesołowska in 1995.

References

Spiders described in 1995
Spiders of Central Asia
Salticidae
Taxa named by Wanda Wesołowska